Last Safe Place is the fourth album by LeRoux released in 1982. It is the band's last album with Jeff Pollard and Bob Campo involved.

The album peaked at #64 on the Billboard 200, becoming the band's most successful album. "Nobody Said It Was Easy" is the album's (and the band's) only Top 20 hit, peaking at #18 on the Billboard Hot 100.

Track listing

Personnel
LeRoux
Jeff Pollard – lead vocals, guitar
Tony Haselden – electric guitar, acoustic guitar, lead and backing vocals
Leon Medica – bass, backing vocals
David Peters – drums, backing vocals
Rod Roddy – lead and backing vocals, keyboards, synthesizer
Bobby Campo – backing vocals, percussion

Additional musicians
Claudette Rogers - backing vocals (5)
Lon Price - saxophone (5, 10)

Production
Producer: Leon Medica
Engineers: Warren Dewey, David Farrell, Terry Christian
Photography: David Kennedy

Charts
Album

Singles

References

External links

1982 albums
RCA Records albums
albums recorded at Studio in the Country